In mathematics, a chiral algebra is an algebraic structure introduced by  as a rigorous version of the rather vague concept of a chiral algebra in physics. In Chiral Algebras, Beilinson and Drinfeld introduced the notion of chiral algebra, which based on the pseudo-tensor category of D-modules. They give an 'coordinate independent' notion of vertex algebras, which are based on formal power series. Chiral algebras on curves are essentially conformal vertex algebras.

Definition 
A chiral algebra on a smooth algebraic curve  is a right D-module , equipped with a D-module homomorphism

  (Skew-symmetry)
  (Jacobi identity)
 The unit map is compatible with the homomorphism ; that is, the following diagram commutes

 is the canonical bundle, and the 'diagonal extension by delta-functions'  is

Relation to other algebras

Vertex algebra 
The category of vertex algebras as defined by Borcherds or Kac is equivalent to the category of chiral algebras on  equivariant with respect to the group  of translations.

Factorization algebra 
Chiral algebras can also be reformulated as factorization algebras.

See also 
Chiral homology
Chiral Lie algebra

References

Further reading 

Conformal field theory
Representation theory